Ann of the Airlanes is a syndicated American radio adventure drama series broadcast between 1932 and the 1950s.

Characters and story 

The story focused on Ann Burton, an aspiring airplane hostess portrayed by Lynne Howard (possibly a stage name for Hollywood native Elia Braca). She also worked with the Secret Service, as did her romantic interest, Interstate Airlines pilot Jack Baker (Robert C. Bruce). Gerald Mohr portrayed Secret Service agent and co-pilot Art Morrison. Also in the cast was John Gibson who portrayed Pete.

There were more than a few radio aviation dramas during the 1930s, but this was the only one with a female lead.

Listen to 
 Internet Archive: Ann of the Airlanes

References

1930s American radio programs
American radio dramas
Aviation radio series